Brynhyfryd may refer to:
Brynhyfryd, Aberdare
Brynhyfryd, Bargoed
Brynhyfryd, Caerphilly
Brynhyfryd, Cwmbran
Brynhyfryd, Llanelli
Brynhyfryd, Neath
Brynhyfryd, Swansea
Brynhyfryd, Wrexham

See also: Ysgol Brynhyfryd secondary school, Denbighshire